Prismosticta tianpinga is a moth in the family Endromidae first described by Xing Wang, Guo-Hua Huang and Min Wang in 2011. It is found in the Chinese province of Hunan.

The length of the forewings is 16–18 mm for males. The forewing ground colour is greenish brown, the apical part of the forewing with a triangular white hyaline (glass-like) dot. The anterior part of the hindwing is red brown and the posterior part greenish brown.

Etymology
The specific name refers to Tianping Mountain which is the type locality.

References

Moths described in 2011
Prismosticta